Mulville is a surname. People with that name include:

 Daniel Mulville (born 1939), American engineer who served briefly as Acting Administrator of NASA in 2001
 Jacqui Mulville (active from 1995), British bioarchaeologist
 Jimmy Mulville (born 1955), English comedian, comedy writer, producer and television presenter

See also
 Melville (disambiguation)
 Mulville House, a historic house in Norfolk, Connecticut